Taras Yastremskyy (Ukrainian: Тарас Ястремський) is a paralympic swimmer from Ukraine competing mainly in category S9 events.

Taras has twice competed at the Paralympics for the Ukrainian team firstly in 2004 and then again in 2008.  In both years he failed to make the final of the 50m freestyle and 400m freestyle.  In the 2004 games he finished eighth in the 100m freestyle final, failed to make the final of the 200m individual medley and was part of the Ukrainian quartet that finished fifth in the heat of the  freestyle and sixth in the final of the  medley. In the 2008 games he failed to make the final of the 100m freestyle but did win a bronze medal in the  medley with his Ukrainian teammates.

References

External links
 

Year of birth missing (living people)
Living people
Ukrainian male medley swimmers
Paralympic swimmers of Ukraine
Paralympic bronze medalists for Ukraine
Paralympic medalists in swimming
S9-classified Paralympic swimmers
Swimmers at the 2004 Summer Paralympics
Swimmers at the 2008 Summer Paralympics
Medalists at the 2008 Summer Paralympics
Medalists at the World Para Swimming European Championships